The 1999 Copa América was a football tournament held in Paraguay, from 29 June to 18 July. It was organized by CONMEBOL, South America's football governing body.

There was no qualifying for the final tournament. Mexico and Japan were invited to take part, with the latter becoming the first team to from outside the Americas to participate in the competition. Uruguay sent a youth team.

Competing nations
As with previous tournaments, all ten members of CONMEBOL participated in the competition. In order to bring the number of competing teams to twelve, CONMEBOL invited Mexico (accepting their fourth invitation) from the CONCACAF and Japan from the AFC.

 
 
  (holders)
 
 
 
  (invitee)
  (invitee)
  (hosts)

Venues
A total of four host cities hosted the tournament. The opening and final game were hosted by Estadio Defensores del Chaco.

Squads
For a complete list of participating squads: 1999 Copa América squads

Venue selection
Paraguay was chosen to be the venue by defeating Colombia by seven votes to three.

Group stage
The teams were divided into three groups of four teams each. The formation of the groups was made by CONMEBOL, in a public drawing of lots.

Each team plays one match against each of the other teams within the same group. Three points are awarded for a win, one point for a draw and zero points for a defeat.

First and second placed teams, in each group, advance to the quarter-finals.
The best third placed team and the second best third placed team, also advance to the quarter-finals.

 Tie-breaker
 If teams finish leveled on points, the following tie-breakers are used:
 greater goal difference in all group games;
 greater number of goals scored in all group games;
 winner of the head-to-head match between the teams in question;
 drawing of lots.

Group A

Group B

Group C

Ranking of third-placed teams
At the end of the first stage, a comparison was made between the third-placed teams of each group. The two best third-placed teams advanced to the quarter-finals.

Knockout stage

Quarter-finals

Semi-finals

Third-place match

Final

Result

Goal scorers
With five goals apiece, Ronaldo and Rivaldo were the tournament's top scorers. In total, 74 goals were scored by 45 different players, with one credited as an own goal.

5 Goals
  Ronaldo
  Rivaldo

4 Goals
  Amoroso

3 Goals

  Martín Palermo
  Iván Zamorano
  Luis Hernández
  Miguel Ángel Benítez
  Roque Santa Cruz
  Marcelo Zalayeta

2 Goals

  Pedro Reyes
  Víctor Bonilla
  Iván Kaviedes
  Wagner Lopes
  Cuauhtémoc Blanco
  Roberto Holsen

1 Goal

  Kily González
  Diego Simeone
  Juan Pablo Sorín
  Erwin Sánchez
  Alex
  Emerson
  Ronaldinho
  Raúl Palacios
  José Luis Sierra
  Jorge Bolaño
  Edwin Congo
  Iván Córdoba
  Johnnier Montaño
  Neider Morantes
  Hámilton Ricard
  Ariel Graziani
  Atsuhiro Miura
  Daniel Osorno
  Francisco Palencia
  Isaac Terrazas
  Gerardo Torrado
  Miguel Zepeda
  Roberto Palacios
  José Pereda
  Nolberto Solano
  Jorge Soto
  Ysrael Zúñiga
  Alejandro Lembo
  Gabriel Urdaneta

Own Goal
  Edson Tortolero

Final positions

Marketing

Sponsorship
Global platinum sponsor
MasterCard
Telefónica

Global gold sponsor
Anheuser-Busch InBev (Budweiser is the brand advertised)
Coca-Cola
Umbro

Local suppliers
Traffic Group
Bansud
Grupo Financiero Banamex

References

External links

 Copa América 1999 at RSSSF

 
1999
International association football competitions hosted by Paraguay
1998–99 in Mexican football
1999 in Japanese football
Sports competitions in Asunción
1999,Copa America
Ciudad del Este District